Doctors in Distress is a British charity dedicated to reducing the prevalence of burn-out and suicide amongst health workers in the UK. 

It was set up in 2019 after the suicide of Dr Jagdip Sidhu, a cardiologist who killed himself in November 2018  by Amandip Sidhu, his brother.  It campaigns for greater awareness of the pressures facing doctors and more compassionate and supportive workplaces and to help medical professionals to feel they can talk openly about issues like burnout and mental health.

Dame Clare Gerada is chair of the charity,   which aims to reduce suicides amongst doctors and other health care workers. It exists with the goal of zero suicides amongst doctors by 2025. "DiD have many laudable ways of reaching this target but we have a most urgent priority which is to create a network of facilitated therapeutic spaces where doctors can talk about the emotional impact of their work, gaining support from each other, in a safe, non-stigmatising environment."  

The suicide rate among doctors is estimated at between two and five times higher than for the general population.

By 2022 they had assisted more than 2,500 healthcare professionals.

References

External links

Health charities in the United Kingdom